Capitalist Casualties were an American powerviolence / hardcore band.  They formed in Rohnert Park, CA around 1986 and had their first concert in 1987 in Santa Rosa, California They have released multiple records, including many splits with other powerviolence / hardcore bands, and have toured nationally and internationally.

Members 
 Shawn Elliott – vocals (1987–2018); died 2018 
 Jeff Robinson – bass guitar, vocals (1987–2018)
 Matt Martin (1987–1995/1996) – drums
 "Spider Mike" Vinatieri – guitar (1987–2018); died 2021
 "Hirax Max" Ward – drums (1996–2004?)
 "H Murder" Haroldo Mardones – drums (2004–2018)

Discography

Albums and EPs 
The Art of Ballistics (Slap-A-Ham, EP, 1991)
Disassembly Line (Slap-A-Ham, LP, 1992)
Raised Ignorant (Slap-A-Ham, EP, 1993)
Live Butchery (Vibrator, EP, 1994)
A Collection of Out-of-Print Singles, Split EPs and Compilation Tracks (Slap-A-Ham, CD, 1997)
Dope and War (Slap-A-Ham, EP, 1997)
Dark Circle (Consiracy Evolve, EP, 1999)
Subdivisions in Ruin (Six Weeks, LP, 1999)
Planned Community (Six Weeks, EP, 2000)
1996-1999: Years in Ruin (Six Weeks, CD, 2004)

Splits 
 Split Personality with The Dread (Six Weeks, EP, 1993)
 split with Discordance Axis (Pulp, EP, 1994)
 Liberty Gone with Millions of Dead Cops (Slap-A-Ham, EP, 1994)
 split with Man Is the Bastard (Six Weeks, LP, 1994)
 split with Slight Slappers  (Sound Pollution, MCR,  EP, 1995)
 split with Ulcer (Six Weeks, EP, 1995)
 Fear Persuasion Violence Obedience split 10" with Cripple Bastards, Masskontroll and Warpath (Wiggy, EP, 1995)
 split with Stack (Six Weeks, EP, 1996)
 split with Monster X (Hater of God, EP, 2000)
 split with Unholy Grave (Deaf American, EP, 2000)
 split with Macabre (D.B.D., EP, 2001)
 split with Hellnation (Sound Pollution/Six Weeks, LP/CD, 2008)
 split with Lack of Interest (Six Weeks, EP, 2010)

 A Painful Split with NoComply (To Live a Lie, EP, 2011)

References

External links
 

Anarcho-punk groups
Hardcore punk groups from California
Powerviolence groups